Más Allá del Sur is Argentine electrotango band Tanghetto's third studio album (or fourth if taken in consideration Hybrid Tango, a side project). The album was released in November 2009.

According to the band's website, the album represents a move towards the roots of a more traditional tango, while keeping the modern elements that are a trademark of Tanghetto.

In 2010 the album received a Gardel Award nomination.

Track list 
 Tango Místico (3:39)
 La Milonga (3:28)
 Leitmotif (4:11)
 Blue Tango (3:49)
 Biorritmo Porteño (4:11)
 Abril (3:43)
 Zita (de la "Suite Troileana", de Astor Piazzolla) (4:31)
 La Zamba (4:36)
 Dos Días en Buenos Aires (3:19)
 Bahía Blanca (tango de Carlos Di Sarli) (3:14)
 Fake Plastic Trees (Radiohead cover) (4:49)
 Más allá del Sur (3:35)

Players 
Max Masri: synthesizers and programming
Diego S. Velázquez: nylon string guitar, electric guitar, electric bass
Antonio Boyadjian: acoustic and electric piano
Federico Vazquez: bandoneon
Chao Xu: violoncello and erhu
Daniel Corrado: electronic and acoustic Drums, percussion
Ricardo Josa: bombo legüero in "La Zamba" (guest musician)
Jorge Tibaud: double bass in "Tango Místico, "Abril" and "Bahía Blanca" (guest musician)

Videoclips 
 Tango Místico (2010)
 La Milonga (2010)

2009 albums
Tanghetto albums